Vincent Peugnet (born 5 February 1998) is a French professional footballer who plays as a defender for Progrès Niederkorn in Luxembourg.

Professional career
Peugnet made his professional debut for FC Metz in a 0–0 (2–1) penalty shootout Coupe de France win over Tours FC on 24 January 2018. On 30 May 2018, Peugnet signed his first professional contract with Metz for 3 years.

On 31 May 2021, he agreed to join Championnat National side Cholet.

On 28 January 2022, he returned to Luxembourg and signed a 1.5-year contract with Progrès Niederkorn.

References

External links
 
 MetzProfile
 Sofoot Profile
 

1998 births
Footballers from Metz
Living people
Association football defenders
French footballers
FC Metz players
Jeunesse Esch players
SO Cholet players
FC Progrès Niederkorn players
Ligue 2 players
Luxembourg National Division players
Championnat National players
Championnat National 2 players
Championnat National 3 players
French expatriate footballers
Expatriate footballers in Luxembourg
French expatriate sportspeople in Luxembourg